KCVH may refer to:

 Hollister Municipal Airport (ICAO code KCVH)
 KCVH-LD, a low-power television station (channel 6) licensed to serve Houston, Texas, United States